John L. Mostiler (March 9, 1923 – December 17, 1994) was an American politician. He served as a Democratic member for the 71-2 and 75th district of the Georgia House of Representatives.

Life and career
Born in Spartanburg, South Carolina, Mostiler attended North Carolina State University, where he earned his Bachelor of Science degree in 1950. He served in the United States Air Force during World War II.

In 1975, Mostiler won the election for the 71-2 district of the Georgia House of Representatives, succeeding J. Neal Shepard Jr. and serving until 1983. That year he succeeded Neal Jackson for the 75th district of the Georgia House of Representatives. In 1989, he was succeeded by John P. Yates.

Mostiler died in December 1994 in Griffin, Georgia, at the age of 71. He was buried in Oak Hill Cemetery.

References 

1923 births
1994 deaths
Politicians from Spartanburg, South Carolina
Democratic Party members of the Georgia House of Representatives
20th-century American politicians
North Carolina State University alumni
Burials in Georgia (U.S. state)